Oak Lawn is a historic plantation house and national historic district located near Huntsboro, Granville County, North Carolina.  The plantation house was built about 1820, and is a two-story, five bay, transitional Federal / Georgian / Greek Revival style heavy timber frame dwelling.  Also on the property are the contributing one-room former dwelling, smokehouse, barn, office, two-room kitchen, a small mortise and tenon barn and attached shed, a long frame packhouse, frame chicken barn, frame corn crib, and frame packhouse.

It was listed on the National Register of Historic Places in 1988.

References

Plantation houses in North Carolina
Houses on the National Register of Historic Places in North Carolina
Historic districts on the National Register of Historic Places in North Carolina
Georgian architecture in North Carolina
Greek Revival houses in North Carolina
Federal architecture in North Carolina
Houses completed in 1820
Houses in Granville County, North Carolina
National Register of Historic Places in Granville County, North Carolina